Bobby Burns may refer to:
 Bobby Burns (actor) (1878–1966), American film actor and director
 Bobby Burns (footballer) (born 1999), Northern Irish footballer
 Bobby Burns (ice hockey) (1905–1995), Canadian ice hockey player
 Bobby Burns, heavy metal guitarist for the band Primer 55
 Robert Burns (1759–1796), Scottish poet and lyricist
 Bobby Burns (drink), a type of cocktail

See also
 Bob Burns (disambiguation)
 Robert Burns (disambiguation)